Frigyes Turán (born January 10, 1974 in Budapest) is a Hungarian rally driver.

Career
A regular competitor in the Hungarian national championship, Turán made his World Rally Championship debut at the 2010 Rally de Portugal driving a Peugeot 307 WRC, finishing 23rd overall. At the next event, Rally Bulgaria, he finished an impressive eighth, ahead of WRC regular Matthew Wilson. His next rally in WRC was Rally France, he retired at 9th Special Stage. At Rally Catalunya he raced with Ford Focus RS WRC 08 instead of his usual Peugeot 307 WRC. He had stronge results for privateer, finished 2nd day of rally at 7th place but had to retire after crash at first special stage of 3rd day (13th stage of whole rally).

Complete WRC results

SWRC results

† Excluded from Championship.

References

External links
 Synergon Turán Motorsport
 Profile at eWRC-results.com

1974 births
Hungarian rally drivers
Living people
World Rally Championship drivers